Bllatë e Sipërme (Upper Bllatë) is a settlement in the former Maqellarë municipality, Dibër County, northeastern Albania. At the 2015 local government reform it became part of the municipality Dibër In this village a border crossing point with Macedonia is situated.

References

Populated places in Dibër (municipality)
Albania–North Macedonia border crossings
Villages in Dibër County